Dr. Hamed al-Bargi also transliterated as Hamed Al-Bargi (Arabic:حامد البارقي) is a Consultant of Oral and Maxillofacial Surgery in King Fahad Armed Forces Hospital, Visiting Professor at Thomas Jefferson University Hospital, Department of Oral and Maxillofacial Surgery, OMFS – USA, Oral and Maxillofacial Surgery Certificate Thomas Jefferson University Hospital USA, Fellowship in Facial Reconstruction – USA 2003-2004. He has patented a Dental plaque brush for bridges and Expandable litter apparatus.

Career

DMD. Temple University, Philadelphia PA, USA.
A.E.G.D. Temple University, Philadelphia, PA, USA.
OMFS Thomas Jefferson University Hospital Philadelphia, PA, USA.
Fellowship in Facial Reconstruction Thomas Jefferson University Hospital Philadelphia, PA, USA.
Consultant of Oral and Maxillofacial Surgery and Residents Training Program Director King Khalid National Guard Hospital Saudi.
Vice president of Saudi Oral and Maxillofacial Surgery Society

References

External links 
https://www.youtube.com/watch?v=CH6VmsHmqY0

Living people
Saudi Arabian Muslims
Saudi Arabian maxillofacial surgeons
Year of birth missing (living people)